On Saturday 6 June 1931, an election was held in the Australian state of Victoria to choose 17 of the 34 members of the Victorian Legislative Council, the upper house of the Victorian parliament. Preferential voting was used.

Results

Legislative Council

Retiring Members

Nationalist
Alexander Bell MLC (Wellington)
Howard Hitchcock MLC (South Western)

Candidates
Sitting members are shown in bold text. Successful candidates are highlighted in the relevant colour. Where there is possible confusion, an asterisk (*) is also used.

See also
1932 Victorian state election

References

1931 elections in Australia
Elections in Victoria (Australia)
1930s in Victoria (Australia)
June 1931 events